Tres veces Ana (The Three Sides of Ana) is a Mexican telenovela produced by Angelli Nesma Medina for Televisa. It is a remake of Lazos de amor produced in 1995. It premiered on May 23, 2016.

The series stars Angelique Boyer as Ana Lucía, Ana Laura and Ana Leticia, Sebastián Rulli as Santiago and Marcelo, David Zepeda as Ramiro, Susana Dosamantes as Ernestina, Blanca Guerra as Soledad, Pedro Moreno as Iñaki, and Eric del Castillo as Evaristo.

Plot 
Ana Lucía, Ana Leticia, and Ana Laura Alvarez Del Castillo are identical triplets with very different personalities. The story starts twenty years ago when Ana Leticia unintentionally caused the death of their parents in a car accident when she grabbed the steering wheel from her father due to a tantrum fit. It was believed that Ana Lucía had drowned in the river in which the family car fell and only Ana Leticia and Ana Laura survived. Local woman, Soledad Hernández, who was suffering from the loss of her young daughter, finds Ana Lucía in the river and raises her as her own. Ana Lucia grows up knowing nothing about her true origins. She was raised as a headstrong but compassionate woman who loves her friends and family, especially her mother.

Meanwhile, Ana Laura is a sweet but quiet and lonely girl who wants to find her missing sister, refusing to believe she is dead. She lost a leg in the car accident which gave her an inferiority complex. She falls in love with Ramiro, who also loves her, but she doesn't feel worthy of his love and thinks he just feels sorry for her due to her disability. Growing up with Ana Laura in the mansion is Ana Leticia. It seems Ana Leticia was the only one that was unharmed in the accident but actually she is paranoid all her life due to her secret (her involvement in the accident years ago). Unlike Ana Laura, Ana Leticia is a narcissist. She is glamorous, selfish, and manipulative, always needing to be the center of attention, especially with her grandmother, Ernestina (who also believes Ana Lucía is alive), and her adopted uncle, Mariano (with whom Ana Leticia is secretly in love with), the twins' guardians.

Ana Leticia is allied with Iñaki who becomes her accomplice to her evil plots and deceits. In San Nicolas, Ana Lucía meets Santiago Garcia; his real name is actually Marcelo Salvaterra, but he had an accident caused by his nemesis, Evaristo Guerra on orders of Ana Leticia, his wife 3 years prior, and as a result, has no memory of his true identity or past and is presumed dead. Given a home by Remedios, Santiago leads an ordinary life as a taxi driver and has dreams of Ana Leticia, but her face is blurred. Soledad doesn't want Ana Lucía close to Santiago, due to Marcelo having threatened her before the accident, and they separate. Lucía and Soledad come to Mexico City, where they meet Remedios and unexpectedly cross paths with Santiago. Ramiro, Marcelo's best friend, finds him and Ana Lucía. Remedios discovers Soledad's secret but remains quiet. Blood ties will eventually join the sisters, interweaving their lives in an unexpected way, bringing back together what was once separated.

Cast

Main 

 Angelique Boyer as Ana Lucía / Ana Laura / Ana Leticia Alvarez del Castillo 
 Sebastián Rulli as Santiago García / Marcelo Salvaterra
 David Zepeda as Ramiro Fuentes
 Susana Dosamantes as Ernestina Rivadeneira
 Blanca Guerra as Soledad Hernández 
 Pedro Moreno as Iñaki Nájera
 Eric del Castillo as Evaristo Guerra

Recurring 

 Ana Bertha Espín as Remedios García
 Luz María Jérez as Julieta
 Leticia Perdigón as Doña Chana
 Nuria Bages as Leonor
 Mónika Sánchez as Viridiana
 Otto Sirgo as Rodrigo Casasola
 Carlos de la Mota as Valentín
 Antonio Medellín as Isidro
 Roberto Ballesteros as Tadeo
 Sachi Tamashiro as Maribel
 Alfredo Gatica as Orlando
 Juliana Teresa as Isabella Cabañas
 Alan Slim as Javier
 Arsenio Campos as Sandro
 Rolando Brito as Edmundo Fuentes
 Fabían Pizzorno as Facundo
 Raúl Magaña as Ignacio
 Ricardo Barona as Alfredo
 Jackie Sauza as Lourdes Rivadeneira de Álvarez del Castillo 
 Nataly Umaña as Gina
 Vanessa Angers as Valeria
 Maru Dueñas as Cecilia
 Adriana Ahumada as Susy
 Archy Lanfranco as Samuel
 Ricardo Kleinbaum as Aníbal
 José Montini as El Curvas
 Ramiro Fumazoni as Mariano

Guest 
 Olivia Bucio as Nerina
 Laisha Wilkins as Jennifer
 Nicolás Mena as Cristian
 Alfonso Iturralde as Bernardo
 Eddy Vilard as Daniel
 Lucero Lander as Miranda

Production 
Production on the telenovela began on January 4, 2016 in Mexico City. Alex Sirvent has been confirmed to perform the theme songs of the telenovela.
During the casting process and pre-production, the telenovela's working title was "Como tres gotas de agua".

On December 22, 2015 Angelique Boyer confirmed through her Twitter account that the ultimate title of the telenovela was Frente al mismo rostro. In March 2016 the title was changed again, becoming Tres veces Ana.

Awards and nominations

References 

Mexican telenovelas
2016 telenovelas
Televisa telenovelas
2016 Mexican television series debuts
2016 Mexican television series endings
Spanish-language telenovelas